Avadaiyarkoil block is a Revenue block  in Pudukkottai district, Tamil Nadu, India. It has a total of 35 panchayat villages.

TK DHARMAPURI. DT
1.	Amaradakki 
2.	Kalabam 
3.	Karur, Pudukkottai 
4.	Kathiramangalam 
5.	Kavadukudi 
6.	Keelachery 
7.	Keelkudivattadur 
8.	Kundagavayal 
9.	Kunnur, Pudukkottai 
10.	Mimisal 
11.	Nattanipurasakudi  
12.	Okkur, Pudukkottai 
13.	Palavarasan 
14.	Pandipathiram 

15.	Perunavalur 
16.	Ponnamangalam 
17.	Ponpethi 
18.	Poovalur, Pudukkottai 
19.	Punniyavayal  
20.	Puthambur 
21.	Sattiyakudi 
22.	Senganam 
23.	Sirumarudur 
24.	Thalanur 
25.	Theeyadur 
26.	Theeyur 
27.	Thirupperundurai 
28.	Thiruppunavasal 
29.	Thondamandendal 
30.	Thunjanur 
31.	Veeramangalam 
32.	Velivayal 
33.	Velvarai 
34.	Vettanur 
35.	Vilanur

References 

Revenue blocks of Pudukkottai district